The Rainbow Ballroom, at 38 E 5th Avenue (at N Lincoln Street), Denver, was a dance hall that was one of the best known dance halls west of the Mississippi, according to a 1946 Billboard article. Its capacity of 3,000 made it the largest indoor dance hall in Colorado during its 28 years of existence — from its opening day on September 16, 1933, to its closing day in 1961.

Dance band era 
The ballroom was host venue for national big bands (often referred to as orchestras) and territory bands.  The bands included:

 Louis Armstrong's Big Band (with Sid Catlett)
 Clyde Knight Orchestra (1941)
 Les Brown
 Verne Byers and His Orchestra (1949 for 17 weeks)
 Duke Ellington (1952, 53)
 Fletcher Henderson
Sammy Kaye (Swing and sway with Sammy Kaye and his orchestra)
 Lawrence Welk (1936)
 Wayne King
 Harry James
 Al Sky and His Musical Stars (1930s)
 Little Joe Hart and his Boys (1937)
 Kay Barclay and Her California All-Girl Orchestra (1937)
 Tiny Hill
 Woody Herman
 Bobby Beers
 Don Reid Orchestra
 Billy Eckstine
 Carl (The Squeakin' Deacon) Moore
 Ralph Flanagan Orchestra (1954)
 Joe Houston (1954)
 Benny Goodman
 The Dean Bushnell Orchestra
 Lalo Guerrero
 Stan Kenton (1954)
 Sauter-Finegan Orchestra (1954)
 Bennie Moten (1935)†
 Johnny Otis (1954)
 Andy Kirk's Clouds of Joy (with Mary Lou Williams) (1935, 1940)
 Seger Ellis (1940)
 Lefty Frizzell (1953)
 Lionel Hampton
 Gene Ammons
 Illinois Jacquet
 Tab Smith (1955)
 Chuck Berry (1959)
 Dizzy Gillespie and His Orchestra (1959)
 Phil Urso and His Quintet (1959)

† On the opening night for Bennie Moten's band at the Rainbow Ballroom in 1935, Bennie had stayed behind in Kansas City for a routine tonsillectomy.  As the band got underway, the band found out from a phone call to Bus Moten, Bennie's brother, that Bennie had died on the operating table.  Bus Moten took over the band for six months or so and then the band broke up.  After the break-up, Moten's pianist and arranger, known then as "Bill Basie," organized a small band of his own, composed of several leading musicians from the Moten band.  Eventually (still in 1935), Basie enlarged the band at the Reno Club in Kansas City to the big band model that sustained him the rest of his career.

Ownership 

In 1933, its owner, Orlaf K. Farr (b. 1894 Ogden, Utah; d. 1981 Sun City, CA; married to Dorcas N. Farr), hired Rudolph Michael Schindler, a well-known architect, to design a conversion from an existing arena amusement hall that had been built in 1927.  Schindler's task, essentially was to design the installation of a $50,000 dance floor.

The building, still in existence, is located on the southwest corner of 5th Avenue and Lincoln, Denver, Colorado.  Beyer was owner of the York Hotel in Denver and Norton was the owner of the Lewiston Hotel at 731 18th Street, Denver (both hotels may have been more like boarding houses).

Farr operated Rainbow Ballroom since its opening until selling in December 1946 to Felix Bernard Beyer (b. Sept. 28, 1888, Denver, CO; d. Oct. 4, 1977, Lakewood, CO) and James Raymond Norton (b. 1894, Prairie City, IA; d. 1990 Las Vegas, NV).

Verne Byers, Felix Beyer's son, became manager of the Rainbow Room January 24, 1947.  Byers continued the past policy of booking territory bands and name bands.  The hall had a capacity of 3000 and was open six nights a week.

In 1948, James Norton purchased Felix Beyer's interest in the ballroom and then leased it for 10 years to Joseph Leher, an ex-GI.

At some point in the 1950s, Joseph Leher (1921–1990) purchased the Rainbow Ballroom.

Affiliations 
Its original owner, Orlaf K. Farr, was a charter member of the Midwestern Ballroom Operators' Association (MBOA), established in 1942.

Closing 
The Rainbow Ballroom closed in 1961. Subsequent to its closing as a ballroom, the building was used as a demonstration chamber for missiles by Martin Company, then a warehouse, then, in 2002, a renovated office building.

Riot at the ballroom 
In July 1959, a race riot broke out during a Fats Domino concert/dance when an unidentified man kicked over the table of a man and woman who had just finished a dance – the man was African American and the woman was Caucasian.  It took more than an hour to quell the disturbance which drew 18 police patrol cars, three police paddy wagons, and an ambulance.  Police estimated that were 2,500 people in the ballroom during the disturbance and that 40 different fights were going on when they arrived.  The concert promoter, LeRoy Smith (1911–1989), estimated that 1,600 were in attendance and that only 4 fights had broken out.  There were no serious injuries or damage to the ballroom.  No arrests were made.

Current use 
After years of abuse and neglect, the red brick building at 38 E. Fifth Avenue was renovated in 2002 into offices by the architectural firm of Sink Combs Dethlefs.  The renewed facility serves as the national headquarters for the architectural firm and is shared with several businesses. The entrance is at 475 N Lincoln Street.

See also 
 Territory bands
 Verne Byers

References

External links  
 

Defunct nightclubs in the United States
Dance venues in the United States
Former music venues in the United States
Music venues in Colorado
1933 establishments in Colorado
1961 disestablishments in Colorado
Rudolph Schindler buildings